Rudolf Turkaj (born 3 February 1995) is an Albanian professional footballer who currently play as a forward for Albanian club Laçi.

References

1995 births
Living people
People from Lezhë County
People from Lezhë
Albanian footballers
Association football defenders
Association football forwards
Kategoria Superiore players
Kategoria e Parë players
Shkëndija Tiranë players
Besëlidhja Lezhë players
KF Shënkolli players
KS Iliria players
KF Laçi players
Albania international footballers